Michael George Ogburn (born 19 February 1948) is an English retired professional football full back who played in the Football League for Brentford.

Career statistics

References

1948 births
English footballers
English Football League players
Brentford F.C. players
Living people
Footballers from Portsmouth
Association football fullbacks
Portsmouth F.C. players